Marengo may refer to:

Places

United States
 Marengo, Alabama, a community in Marengo County, Alabama
 Marengo County, Alabama, first settled by exiled French Bonapartists
 Marengo, Illinois, a city in Marengo Township, Illinois
 Marengo, Indiana, a town
 Marengo Cave
 Marengo, Iowa, a city
 Marengo, Michigan
 Marengo, Nebraska
 Marengo, Ohio, a village in Morrow County
 Marengo, Lucas County, Ohio, a ghost town
 Marengo, Adams County, Washington, an unincorporated community
 Marengo, Columbia County, Washington, an unincorporated community
 Marengo, Wisconsin, a town
 Marengo (community), Wisconsin, an unincorporated community

Elsewhere
 Spinetta Marengo, Piedmont, Italy, site of the 1800 Battle of Marengo
 Marengo (department), a department of the First French Empire in northern Italy
 Marengo, Saskatchewan, Canada, a village
 Marengo, Victoria, Australia, a town on the Great Ocean Road
 Murringo, New South Wales, Australia, a town near Young formerly named Marengo
 Hadjout, Algeria, formerly named Marengo

People
 Gisella Marengo (born 1975), Italian actress
 Jakob Marengo (1805-1875), Namibian chief leader in the insurrection against the German Empire 
 Juan Tanca Marengo (1895–1965), Ecuadorian physician
 Kimon Evan Marengo (1904–1988), Egyptian-born British cartoonist
 Levi Marengo (born 1987), Dutch footballer
 Lina Marengo (1911–1987), Italian actress
 Ludcinio Marengo (born 1991), Dutch footballer
 Luigi Marengo (1928–2010), Italian painter
 Manuel Marengo (born 1973), Peruvian footballer
 Oreste Marengo (1906-1998), Italian Roman Catholic prelate and Salesians missionary in India
 Ricardo Rodríguez Marengo (born 1998), Argentine professional footballer  
 Rocío Marengo (born 1980), Argentinian model, actress, and dancer
 Umberto Marengo (born 1992), Italian cyclist

Other
 Battle of Marengo, in 1800 in northern Italy
 French ship Marengo, several vessels
 USS Marengo (AK-194), American cargo ship 
 Chicken Marengo, a food dish
 Marengo (spider), a genus of jumping spiders
 Marengo (horse), Napoleon's horse 
 Marengo (racehorse), in the 1847 Grand National Steeplechase
 Fiat Marengo, a mid-sized car-based van from Italian manufacturer Fiat
 Marengo warehouse, a subterranean storage facility in Morengo, Indiana
 Marengo (color), a dark, grayish-black color
 Marengo trial, a court case in the Netherlands

See also
 Morengo, a comune in Italy